Irina Natanovna Press (10 March 1939 – 21 February 2004) was a multitalented Soviet athlete who competed at the 1960 and 1964 Olympics. In 1960, she won a gold medal in the 80 m hurdles and finished fourth in the 4 × 100 m relay. In 1964, she finished fourth in the hurdles and sixth in the shot put, but won gold in the newly introduced pentathlon event.

Together with her elder sister, Tamara, Irina set 26 world records between 1959 and 1966. In 1967 she won her last USSR Championship. Both Press sisters ended their careers abruptly when gender verification was introduced. Some have suggested that the Press sisters were male or intersex. Another allegation was that they were being injected with male hormones by the Soviet government in order to make them stronger. In wartime Soviet evacuation lists from 1942 Irina Press, then aged 3, is identified as a girl.

After retiring from competitions Press earned a degree in physical education and coached at her club Dynamo Moscow. She also took posts in the Soviet sports administration, such as department head of the Soviet and later Russian State Committee on Physical Culture, Sports and Tourism. From 2000 and until her death in 2004, she headed the Moscow Committee of Physical Culture and Sports.

Notes

References

1939 births
2004 deaths
Athletes (track and field) at the 1960 Summer Olympics
Athletes (track and field) at the 1964 Summer Olympics
Dynamo sports society athletes
Jewish female athletes (track and field)
Olympic athletes of the Soviet Union
Olympic gold medalists for the Soviet Union
Soviet pentathletes
Sportspeople from Kharkiv
Soviet female hurdlers
Ukrainian female hurdlers
Soviet Jews
Ukrainian Jews
Sex verification in sports
Medalists at the 1964 Summer Olympics
Medalists at the 1960 Summer Olympics
Olympic gold medalists in athletics (track and field)
Universiade medalists in athletics (track and field)
Olympic female pentathletes
Universiade gold medalists for the Soviet Union
Medalists at the 1961 Summer Universiade